Central Otago District Council is the territorial authority for the Central Otago District of New Zealand.

The council is led by the mayor of Central Otago, who is currently . There are also 11 ward councillors.

Composition

Councillors

 Mayor 
 Vincent Ward: Tamah Alley, Lynley Claridge, Ian Cooney, Martin McPherson, Tracy Paterson
 Cromwell Ward: Neil Gillespie, Shirley Calvert, Cheryl Laws, Nigel McKinlay
 Maniototo Ward: Stuart Duncan
 Teviot Valley Ward: Stephen Jeffery

Community boards

 Cromwell Community Board
 Maniototo Community Board
 Teviot Valley Community Board
 Vincent Community Board

History

The council was established in 1989, through the merger of Cromwell Borough Council (established in 1866), Alexandra Borough Council (established in 1867), Naseby Boroough Council (established in 1872), Maniototo County Council (established in 1876), and Vincent County Council (established in 1876).

In 2020, the council had 154 staff, including 17 earning more than $100,000. According to the Taxpayers' Union think tank, residential rates averaged $2,156.

References

External links

 Official website

Central Otago District
Politics of Otago
Territorial authorities of New Zealand